Dziesławice may refer to the following villages in Poland:
Dziesławice, Lower Silesian Voivodeship (south-west Poland)
Dziesławice, Świętokrzyskie Voivodeship (south-central Poland)